Giovanni Francesco Fortunio (Zadar or Pordenone, ca. 1470 – Fano, 1517) was an Italian grammarian, jurist and humanist.

Biography
He is especially remembered for having printed in 1516 the first ever Italian grammar book with the title Regole grammaticali della volgar lingua. It contains a morphological and orthographical analysis of the Tuscan vernacular based upon works by Dante Alighieri, Francesco Petrarca e Giovanni Boccaccio.

He was also an important politician and vicarian.

Bibliography
 A. Benedetti, Giovanni Francesco Fortunio umanista e primo grammatico della lingua italiana, Pordenone, s.d.

References

1470 births
1517 deaths
Italian Renaissance humanists
16th-century Italian jurists
Grammarians of Italian
Grammarians from Italy